William F. Earley (born February 3, 1943) is an American former politician. He served in the South Dakota House of Representatives from 1999 to 2000 and in the Senate from 2003 to 2006.

References

1943 births
Living people
Politicians from Sioux Falls, South Dakota
Businesspeople from South Dakota
Republican Party members of the South Dakota House of Representatives
Republican Party South Dakota state senators